The Little River is a perennial river of the Mitchell River catchment, located in the Alpine region of the Australian state of Victoria.

Location and features
The Little River rises below Castle Hill, part of the Moroka Range within the Great Dividing Range, north of Avon Wilderness Park and flows generally northwest, before reaching its confluence with the Moroka River in remote country south of the Moroka Gorge within the Alpine National Park in the Shire of Wellington. The river descends  over its  course.

See also

 List of rivers in Australia

References

External links
 
 

East Gippsland catchment
Rivers of Gippsland (region)
Victorian Alps